John D. Doak is an American Republican politician from Oklahoma who served as the 12th Oklahoma Insurance Commissioner.

Biography 
After graduating from the University of Oklahoma in 1988 with a Bachelor of Arts degree in political science, Doak launched a branch of the Farmers Insurance Group in Tulsa, Oklahoma. Doak would later leave Farmers to work for various other insurance companies, eventually being promoted to corporate level positions. Doak is a former board member for the Tulsa Ronald McDonald House, the Tulsa Opera, and Dillon International Adoption Agency. He previously served as a member of the Oklahoma Governor's Round Table for Business Development.

Doak was elected as Insurance Commissioner in 2010, defeating incumbent Democratic opponent Kim Holland.

Personal life 
John Doak and his wife, Debby, live in Tulsa with their two children, Kasey and Zack.

Electoral history

External links 
 Official State biography

21st-century American politicians
Living people
Oklahoma Insurance Commissioners
Oklahoma Republicans
Politicians from Tulsa, Oklahoma
University of Oklahoma alumni
Year of birth missing (living people)